Staphylinochrous albabasis is a species of moth of the Anomoeotidae family. It is found in Angola.

References

External links

Endemic fauna of Angola
Anomoeotidae
Insects of Angola
Moths of Africa
Moths described in 1911